Charity Grimm Krupa (born ) is an American attorney and politician who has represented the 51st District in the Pennsylvania House of Representatives since 2023.

Early life & education 
Krupa was born into a military family near Fort Bragg in North Carolina. She graduated from Albert Gallatin High School in 1998. In 2002, she attained a Bachelor of Arts degree in history from Penn State University and a Doctor of Jurisprudence  degree from West Virginia University in 2005.

Career
Krupa formerly clerked for Fayette County, Pennsylvania Court of Common Pleas Judge Steve Leskinen. From 2012 to 2014 she served as Assistant Fayette County Public Defender.

Krupa served on the Albert Gallatin Area School Board from 2017 to 2020.

After Pennsylvania State Representative Matt Dowling was charged with driving under the influence, Krupa was selected by the Fayette County Republican Committee to replace him on the 2022 general election ballot. She went on to defeat Democrat Richard Ringer to represent the 51st District.

Personal life
Krupa married her husband Brian J. Krupa while in law school and had their first child during her final year. They currently live on their cattle farm in Springfield Township, Fayette County, Pennsylvania with their three children.

References

External links
Charity Grimm Krupa official PA House website

Members of the Pennsylvania House of Representatives
Year of birth uncertain
Living people
21st-century American politicians
21st-century American women politicians
School board members in Pennsylvania
Pennsylvania State University alumni
West Virginia University alumni